The 2003 Nobel Prize in Literature was awarded to the South African novelist John Maxwell Coetzee (born 1940), better known simply as J. M. Coetzee, "who in innumerable guises portrays the surprising involvement of the outsider." He is the fourth African writer to be so honoured and the second South African after Nadine Gordimer in 1991.

Laureate

J. M. Coetzee's prose is rigorous and analytical, spanning through different genres from autobiographical novels to short fiction, essays to translations. He made his debut in 1974 with the novel Dusklands, but his international breakthrough came a few years later with Waiting for the Barbarians in 1980. A recurring theme in his novels is a crucial situation, where right and wrong are put to the test and where people's weaknesses and defeat become fundamental to the story's development. His other novels include Life & Times of Michael K (1983), Disgrace (1999), and his "Jesus" Trilogy: The Childhood of Jesus (2013), The Schooldays of Jesus, and The Death of Jesus (2019).

Nobel lecture
J. M. Coetzee delivered his Nobel Lecture entitled He and His Man at the Swedish Academy on December 7, 2003. His lecture features the characters of Robinson Crusoe and Daniel Defoe that borrows extensively from Defoe's A Journal of the Plague Year (1722) and A Tour thro' the Whole Island of Great Britain (1724-26) where he whimsically explores several concerns of central importance for the activities of reading and writing, most notably the seemingly unavoidable phenomenon of displacement or substitution that is best characterized as catachresis.

References

External links
2003 Prize announcement nobelprize.org
Award ceremony speech nobelprize.org
Nobel diploma nobelprize.org

2003
J. M. Coetzee